Daniel Kiss (born 14 April 1984) is a Slovak goalkeeper.

Kiss started his career in Slovan Bratislava. On 10 August 2008 he arrived in Bulgaria to move to Levski Sofia for a fee around 100 000 euro.

PFC Levski Sofia
Kiss made his official debut for Levski on 17 August 2008, in a match against Botev Plovdiv. The result of the match was 6:0.

On 7 December 2008 he was dismissed from Levski and told he was free to look around for a new team. He transferred to Artmedia Petrzalka in his home country.

External links 
  Slovan Bratislava profile
  Kiss's  profile at Levski's official site
 Profile at LevskiSofia.info

1984 births
Living people
Slovak footballers
ŠK Slovan Bratislava players
Association football goalkeepers
First Professional Football League (Bulgaria) players
PFC Levski Sofia players
Expatriate footballers in Bulgaria
FC Petržalka players
FC DAC 1904 Dunajská Streda players
Slovak Super Liga players
People from Galanta
Sportspeople from the Trnava Region